Satsuki is a traditional Japanese name for the month of . It is commonly used as a feminine given name and, more rarely, as a surname or a masculine name.

Possible spellings
Satsuki can be spelled using different kanji characters and can mean:

Either as a given name or surname
 , "May"
 , "early moon/month"
 , "May; dwarf azalea"
 , "shore of a wetland or paddy"

As a given name only
 , "blossom", "moon/month"
 , "sand", "moon/month"
 , "happiness", "rare/hope"

The given name can also be spelled in hiragana or katakana.

People
Given name
 Satsuki (musician) (砂月), ex-member of the group Rentrer en Soi, now a solo artist
 Satsuki Eda (五月), Japanese politician
 Satsuki Fujisawa (五月), Japanese curler 
 Satsuki Igarashi (寒月), member of the all-female manga-creating team Clamp
 Satsuki Katayama (さつき), Japanese representative
 Satsuki Miura (紗津紀), Japanese professional footballer
 Satsuki Mori (颯樹), Japanese footballer
 Satsuki Muramoto (小月), Japanese figure skater
 Satsuki Nakayama (咲月), Japanese model and actor
 Satsuki Obata (さつき), Japanese gymnast
 Satsuki Odo (沙月), Japanese table tennis player
 Satsuki Totoro (さつき), Japanese professional wrestler 
 Satsuki Yukino (五月), Japanese voice actress

Surname
, Japanese rōkyoku singer
, Japanese water polo player
 Midori Satsuki (五月), a Japanese actress

Fictional characters
 Satsuki Kusakabe (サツキ), a main character of the 1988 animated film My Neighbor Totoro
 Satsuki Miyanoshita (さつき), a character in the 2000 anime Ghost Stories
 Satsuki, name of one of the doll agents in Street Fighter Alpha 3
 Satsuki Kitaouji (さつき), a character in the manga and anime series Strawberry 100% (Ichigo 100%)
 Satsuki Yotsuba (五月), a character in the manga and anime series Negima! Magister Negi Magi
 Satsuki Yumiduka (さつき), a character in the manga and anime series Tsukihime
 Satsuki Shinomiya, a character from the game series Uta no Prince-sama
 Satsuki, a character from the manga and anime series InuYasha
 Satsuki Yatouji (颯姫), a character from the manga and anime series X
 Satsuki Ichinose (皐), a character in the manga Nana
 Satsuki Iranami, character in the fangame dra serie based on danganronpa games
Satsuki Shindō (咲月), a male character in the manga Shiawase Kissa Sanchoume
 Satsuki Shishio, a main character of Hirunaka no Ryūsei
 Satsuki Momoi (さつき), a character in the manga and anime series Kuroko's Basketball
 Satsuki Kiryuin (皐月), a main supporting character in the anime Kill la Kill
 Satsuki Hyoudou, a character in the manga and anime series Maid Sama!
Satsuki Kururugi, a character in the video game and anime  I-Chu

See also
 Satsuki azalea, a cultivar group of azaleas
 Satsuki Shō, a Japanese domestic Grade 1 flat horse race
 Japanese destroyer Satsuki, two destroyers of Japan
 Japanese calendar

Japanese-language surnames
Japanese unisex given names